The Secretariat of the 28th Congress of the Communist Party of the Soviet Union (CPSU) was in session from 1990 to 1991.

Officers

Secretaries

Members

References

External links
 Politburo of the Communist Party of the Soviet Union (Узкий состав ЦК РСДРП(б) - Политическое бюро ЦК РСДРП(б) - Бюро ЦК РСДРП(б) - РКП(б) - Политическое бюро ЦК РКП(б) - ВКП(б) - Президиум - Политическое бюро ЦК КПСС). Handbook on history of the Communist Party and the Soviet Union 1898–1991.

Secretariat of the Central Committee of the Communist Party of the Soviet Union members
1990 in the Soviet Union
1991 in the Soviet Union
1990 establishments in the Soviet Union
1991 disestablishments in the Soviet Union